This is a list of National Trust land in England. This is land that is looked after by the National Trust and includes coast, countryside and heritage landscapes. This does not include National Trust properties, unless they contain significant estate land.

The list is subdivided using the National Trust's own system which divides England into nine regions. These are not the same as the official Regions of England.

The counties of England are divided up as follows:

Devon & Cornwall
East of England
Bedfordshire, Cambridgeshire, Essex, part of Hertfordshire, Norfolk, Suffolk
East Midlands
Derbyshire, Leicestershire, S Lincolnshire, Northamptonshire, Nottinghamshire, Rutland
North West
Cheshire, Cumbria, Greater Manchester, Lancashire, Merseyside
South East
East Sussex, Kent, Surrey, West Sussex
Thames & Solent
Berkshire, Buckinghamshire, Hampshire, Isle of Wight, Greater London, Oxfordshire
West Midlands
Birmingham, Herefordshire, Shropshire, Staffordshire, Warwickshire, Worcestershire
Wessex
Bristol / Bath, Dorset, Gloucestershire, Somerset, Wiltshire
Yorkshire & North East
County Durham, N Lincolnshire, Newcastle & Tyneside, Northumberland, Teesside, Yorkshire

Devon & Cornwall

Devon and Cornwall  offer a complete spectrum of places of historic importance and outstanding natural beauty cared for by the National Trust including:-
Much of the Devon and Cornwall coastline
3000 hectares of woodland
15000 hectares of farmland
4000 hectares of within Dartmoor and Exmoor National Parks

East of England

East Midlands

In the East Midlands you can explore magnificent stretches of countryside ranging from the dramatic Peak District to the parkland, heaths and woods of Clumber Park.

North West
Greenhalgh Castle (Garstang Castle), Garstang.

South East

The National Trust owns and cares for 29,000 hectares within this region.

Thames & Solent

The National Trust looks after lots of unspoilt countryside in the Thames & Solent region, including miles of beautiful coastline on the Isle of Wight. 4

West Midlands

Based in the heart of England, the National Trust protects over 8,000 hectares of land in Warwickshire, Worcestershire, Shropshire, Staffordshire, Herefordshire and the West Midlands.

Wessex

The National Trust cares for and protects large areas of countryside throughout Wessex.

Yorkshire & North East

See also
List of National Trust properties in England
List of National Trust properties in Wales
List of National Trust properties in Northern Ireland
List of National Trust for Scotland properties
List of Conservation topics

External links
 The National Trust

National Trust properties in England
National Trust land